Solakrossen or Sola is the administrative center of Sola municipality in Rogaland county, Norway.  The village is located at the south end of the Hafrsfjorden on the Stavanger Peninsula, just northwest of the city of Sandnes.  The large Stavanger Airport, Sola is located on the west side of the village.  The village of Sørnes lies just to the north.  Sola Church lies on the far western edge of Solakrossen.  The population of Solakrossen is about 10,000, but the population is not separately tracked since it is part of the Stavanger/Sandnes urban area. The newspaper Solabladet has been published in Solakrossen since 1991.

References

Villages in Rogaland
Sola, Norway